The Marine Ecosystem Assessment for the Southern Ocean (MEASO) is a project led by researchers at the Antarctic Climate & Ecosystems Cooperative Research Centre (ACE CRC) as a part of an international project of Integrating Climate and Ecosystem Dynamics (ICED).

Aims 

MEASO 2018 
 MEASO 2018 was an international conference held in Hobart in early April 2018, which included a day-long policy forum. Background to the conference, including the program and abstracts, can be found on the www.MEASO2018.aq conference web site.  The conference was supported by Integrated Marine Biosphere Research (IMBeR) ICED and CLIOTOP, Southern Ocean Observing System (SOOS), Scientific Committee on Antarctic Research, and the Australian Antarctic Program to share  science, enhance community input into design and planning of the MEASO, and to develop a work plan.

175 people attended from 23 countries, including  scientists, policy-makers, fishing industry, and environmental NGOs. The conference was focused on four themes: (i) assessments of parts of the ecosystem; (ii) responses of biota to changing environments; (iii) methods for modelling habitats, species and food webs;  (iv)  design of observing systems to measure change in the ecosystem. The day-long policy forum discussed how to better link scientists, policy makers, industry and environmental NGOs and the public at large.

Out of the 175 participants 32% were early career researchers and the gender balance was 43% female to 57% male.

MEASO 2019 
A MEASO workshop was held at the World Wide Fund for Nature British headquarters in Woking, UK from the 3–7 June 2019. It focused on planning the delivery of the first MEASO for 2020. This workshop was attended by 30 international scientists including scientists from 12 countries and 7 early career scientists.

Publication of the MEASO 
In the initial stages of publication for MEASO an 'audit' of the surveys, data and models available to assess the status and trends of Antarctic Southern Ocean species, foodwebs and ecosystems was published in Brasier et al. 2019.

An encyclopaedic resource produced by the MEASO team is the Southern Ocean Knowledge and Information (SOKI) wiki. its pages include  brief fact sheets with numerical and statistical information on different Antarctic Southern Ocean species and taxonomic groups.

References 

Southern Ocean